Joshua Benton (born 1975) is an American journalist and writer. He is director of the Nieman Journalism Lab at Harvard University, which he founded in 2008.

Before moving to Harvard, Benton was an investigative reporter and columnist for The Dallas Morning News and a staff writer for The Toledo Blade. He won numerous national awards for his reporting, most notably on education. He wrote a series of stories on cheating on Texas' state test, the Texas Assessment of Knowledge and Skills, which led to state reforms and the permanent closure of the Wilmer-Hutchins Independent School District.

He was a Nieman Fellow at Harvard, a Pew Fellow in International Journalism at Johns Hopkins University, and a Jefferson Fellow at the East-West Center at the University of Hawaii. At Yale University, he was editor-in-chief of The Yale Herald. Benton was also an early blogger at crabwalk.com.

References

External links

Living people
Harvard University staff
Yale University alumni
Nieman Fellows
1975 births
Writers from Louisiana
American male journalists
Cajun writers
The Dallas Morning News people